Hydroxycholecalciferol may refer to:

 1-Hydroxycholecalciferol (Alfacalcidol)
 25-Hydroxycholecalciferol (Calcifediol or calcidiol)

See also
 1,25-Dihydroxycholecalciferol